Igor Radojević (born 25 June 1990) is a Montenegrin handball player for Eger-Eszterházy SzSE and the Montenegro national team.

He participated at the 2018 European Men's Handball Championship.

References

1990 births
Living people
People from Berane
Montenegrin male handball players
Expatriate handball players
Montenegrin expatriate sportspeople in Hungary
Competitors at the 2018 Mediterranean Games
Mediterranean Games competitors for Montenegro